Abington is an unincorporated community in Abington Township, Wayne County, in the U.S. state of Indiana.

History
Abington was laid out and platted in 1817.

A post office was established at Abington in 1824, and remained in operation until it was discontinued in 1903. The name of this Quaker settlement recalled the Abington Monthly Meeting of the Society of Friends located in Pennsylvania.

Geography

Notable person
Orlando H. Manning, Lieutenant Governor of Iowa.

References

Unincorporated communities in Wayne County, Indiana
Unincorporated communities in Indiana
Populated places established in 1817
1817 establishments in Indiana